Thomson Avenue station is a SEPTA Route 101 trolley stop in Springfield Township, Delaware County, Pennsylvania. It is officially located near Thomson Avenue and Sidman Drive. The platform and shed are located on the south side of Thomson Avenue.

Trolleys arriving at this station travel between 69th Street Terminal in Upper Darby, Pennsylvania and Orange Street in Media, Pennsylvania. The station has a shed with a roof where people can go inside when it is raining. This shed is a traditional "Red Arrow" shed located in an area that's both wooded and residential. Because of this, no parking is available at this station. Thomson Avenue climbs a hill on the west side of this stop as it prepares to terminate at Springfield Hospital on Sproul Road (PA 320), which has a stop of its own at Springfield Mall.

Station layout

External links

 Station from Thomson Avenue from Google Maps Street View

SEPTA Media–Sharon Hill Line stations